Grimpo is a small hamlet in Shropshire, England. Its unusual name was formerly written Grimpool, and is possibly based on an Old English personal name. It developed as a settlement of squatter's cottages on the edge of unenclosed marshland.

Grimpo is in the civil parish of West Felton, which lies a short distance to the west.

References

Villages in Shropshire